Mount Peace Cemetery is a cemetery in Philadelphia, Pennsylvania that is owned and operated by the Odd Fellows organization. It was established in 1865 and is located at 3111 West Lehigh Avenue, near the Laurel Hill Cemetery.

The cemetery property was originally part of the colonial estate of Robert Ralston and kept the estate name of Mount Peace.
Another portion of the estate was used for the creation of Mount Vernon Cemetery.

In May 1913, a statue of James Bartram Nicholson was erected in Mount Peace Cemetery in dedication to his service as Grand Sire of Sovereign Grand Lodge and as Grand Master and Grand Secretary of Grand Lodge of 1.O.O.F. of Pennsylvania.

In 1951, the Oddfellows Cemetery on 22nd street in Philadelphia was closed and the bodies reinterred to other cemeteries operated by the Oddfellows including Lawnview Memorial Park and Mount Peace Cemetery.

The burial records for Mount Peace Cemetery are kept at Lawnview Memorial Park in Rockledge, Pennsylvania.

Notable burials
 Joseph A. Bailly (1825–1883), sculptor
 Charles E. Barber (1840–1917), Sixth Chief Engraver of the U.S. Mint
 Thomas Brigham Bishop (1835–1905), composer of popular music
 Daniel G. Caldwell (1842–1917), U.S. Civil War Medal of Honor recipient
 Charles H. Clausen (1842–1922), U.S. Civil War Medal of Honor recipient
 John W. Comfort (1844–1893), Texas-Indian Wars Medal of Honor recipient
 Horace Fogel (1861–1928), Major League Baseball manager
 Bill Haeffner (1894–1982), professional baseball player
 Bill Hallman (1876–1950), professional baseball player
 Jack Lapp (1884–1920), professional baseball player
 Francis Mahler (1826–1863), Union Army officer in the U.S. Civil War
 Turner Gustavus Morehead (1814–1892), Brevet Brigadier General in the Union Army
 Uriah Smith Stephens (1821–1882), labor leader
 John Weaver (1861–1928), mayor of Philadelphia from 1903 to 1907
 Jimmy Young (1948–2005), professional boxer

References

External links
 Official website
 Mount Peace Cemetery at Find a Grave

1865 establishments in Pennsylvania
Cemeteries established in the 1860s
Cemeteries in Philadelphia
East Falls, Philadelphia
Odd Fellows cemeteries in the United States